Beth Alison Shapiro (born 1976) is an American evolutionary molecular biologist. She is a professor in the Department of Ecology and Evolutionary Biology at the University of California, Santa Cruz. Shapiro's work has centered on the analysis of ancient DNA. She was awarded a MacArthur Fellowship in 2009 and a Royal Society University Research Fellowship in 2006.

Early life and education
Shapiro was born in Allentown, Pennsylvania on January 14, 1976. She grew up in Rome, Georgia, where she served as a local news presenter while still in high school. Having left Rome High School with a GPA of 4.0, Shapiro started at the University of Georgia in 1994. There, she studied Mandarin Chinese, Spanish, English literature and geology at the University, before choosing ecology as her major. She graduated summa cum laude in 1999 with BA and MA degrees in ecology. The same year, she was awarded a Rhodes Scholarship followed by a Ph.D. from the University of Oxford for research on inferring evolutionary history and processes using ancient DNA supervised by Alan J. Cooper.

Career and research
Shapiro was appointed a Wellcome Trust Research Fellow at the University of Oxford in 2004. The same year she was appointed director of the Henry Wellcome Biomolecules Centre at Oxford, a position she held until 2007. In 2006, she was awarded a Royal Society University Research Fellowship. While at the Biomolecules Centre, Shapiro carried out mitochondrial DNA analysis of the dodo.

Shapiro's research on ecology has been published in leading journals including Molecular Biology and Evolution, PLOS Biology, Science and Nature. In 2007, she was named by Smithsonian Magazine as one of 37 young American innovators under the age of 36.

Publications
Her peer reviewed publications in scientific journals and books include:
 Bayesian coalescent inference of past population dynamics from molecular sequences
 Rise and fall of the Beringian steppe bison
Ancient DNA: Methods and Protocols
 How to Clone a Mammoth: The Science of De-Extinction
 Flight of the Dodo
 A late Pleistocene steppe bison (Bison priscus) partial carcass from Tsiigehtchic, Northwest Territories, Canada

Honors and awards

National Geographic Emerging Explorer (2010)
University of Georgia Young Alumnus Award (2010)
MacArthur Fellowship (2009)
Royal Society University Research Fellowship(2006)
Rhodes Scholarship (1999)

References

External links

1976 births
Living people
Evolutionary biologists
Women evolutionary biologists
American women biologists
MacArthur Fellows
Educators from Allentown, Pennsylvania
People from Rome, Georgia
American Rhodes Scholars
University of California, Santa Cruz faculty
University of Georgia alumni
Alumni of Balliol College, Oxford
Royal Society University Research Fellows
American women archaeologists
21st-century American biologists
American archaeologists
21st-century American women